The 2010 Jalaun district bus crash occurred on 17 February 2010 when a bus with approximately 70 passengers, mostly wedding guests, crashed into the Yamuna River at around midnight. It killed 22 of the passengers with at least 13 still unaccounted for.

At around midnight on 17 February 2010, a bus heavily laden with passengers coming back from a wedding, lost control on a makeshift bridge spanning the Yamuna River in Jalaun District of Uttar Pradesh in India. 40 people on the bus managed to escape, by breaking windows, however 22 lost their lives, whilst 13 are still unaccounted for, presumed drowned. Local authorities worked throughout the morning to free trapped people inside the bus and helped save many lives. There is no word on whether the bride and groom who were believed to also be travelling on the bus survived the incident.

References

2010 disasters in India
Bus incidents in India
2010 road incidents
History of Uttar Pradesh (1947–present)
Jalaun district
February 2010 events in India
Transport disasters in Uttar Pradesh